"Bichota"  is a song by Colombian singer-songwriter Karol G. It was written by Karol G, Lenny Tavárez, J Quiles, Cristián Salazar and Ovy on the Drums, and produced by the latter. The song was released on October 23, 2020 through Universal Music Latino, as the third single from her third studio album KG0516.

Background 
The song was first teased days prior to an announcement through Karol G’s social media platforms with the letter 'B' and a emoji of 'coming soon'. The song was officially announced on October 19, 2020 with a teaser for the music video. The single cover art shot by photographer Alfredo Flores, was revealed the following day. The song was released on October 23, 2020.

The word "Bichota" comes from the Puerto Rican slang bichote. A "bichote" is an individual who due to his economic or political position, is considered important or influential, generally related to the sale of drugs. Despite this, Karol G gave the word a new meaning. She stated: "A moment of feeling sexy, flirtatious, daring, strong, empowered, and to a certain extent, translates into personal motivation and self-confidence. We are all super 'Bichotas' inside. It’s about believing and working so that the rest of the world can see it too."

Critical reception 
Billboard stated how the song set the tone for the album, saying: "She came headstrong on the Billboard Hot 100-charting banger with a fierce attitude, fierce beats, and fierce lyrics."

Commercial performance 
"Bichota" debuted at number 97 on the US Billboard Hot 100 chart dated December 5, 2020. The song reached its peak on its 10th week on the chart at number 72 on the chart dated February 13, 2021. The song became the highest charting Spanish song by a female soloist on the Billboard Hot 100 chart until it was surpassed by Telepatía by Kali Uchis.

On the US Billboard Hot Latin Songs chart dated November 7, 2020 the song debuted at number 7, and reached its peak at number 3 on the chart dated December 5, 2020. 
On the Billboard Argentina Hot 100 chart the song reached its top spot. 

The song received a double Latin diamond certification by the Recording Industry Association of America (RIAA) on November 24, 2021, for sales of 1.2 million equivalent-units. On Mexico the song was certified 21 Diamond+3x Platinum by AMPROFON, for sales of 6.4 million equivalent-units, becoming the highest certified song by a solo act and second overall, behind her own Tusa.

Awards and nominations

Music video 
The music video for "Bichota" was directed by Colin Tilley and was released on Karol G’s YouTube channel on October 23, 2020. As of January 2023, it has over 1.1 billion views and 6.4 million likes. 

A second music video was released exclusively on her Facebook page on November 12, 2020. As of January 2023, it has over 337 million views and 4.7 million likes.

Charts

Weekly charts

Year-end charts

Certifications

Release history

See also
List of Billboard number-one Latin songs of 2021

References

2020 songs
2020 singles
Karol G songs
Songs written by Justin Quiles
Spanish-language songs
Song recordings produced by Ovy on the Drums
Music videos directed by Colin Tilley
Latin Grammy Award for Best Reggaeton Performance